Sındırgı, formerly Koruköy and Carseae, is a town and district of Balıkesir Province in the Marmara region of Turkey. The population is 33.753 (as of 2017). The mayor is Ekrem Yavaş (AKP). A carpet festival is held in Sındırgı town in every fall season around September, and it is called International Yağcıbedir Festival. The province is also famous for its kolonya, a scented perfume used to freshen the hands.

References

External links
 District governor's official website 

Populated places in Balıkesir Province
Districts of Balıkesir Province